Ley Karuna is a 1988 Maldivian film directed by Hassan Najumee. Produced by Ibrahim Mohamed Solih, the film stars Mohamed Rasheed, Mariyam Rasheedha and Ahmed Sharumeel in lead roles. The film marked a breakthrough to Mohamed Rasheed's career and is noted to be his first paid film.

Premise
Ali (Mohamed Rasheed) and Mohamed (Ahmed Sharumeel) are two exemplary siblings, who always have each other's back. An unfortunate incident leads Mohamed being handicapped while Ali gets the chance to study in Male'. Years later, Ali stopped writing to Mohamed though the latter desperately waits for a news from him. Ali, now named as Shifaz, lives with a well educated and modern family, where he starts a romantic relationship with the landlord's daughter, Zaina (Mariyam Rasheedha). Her parents fixed her marriage with a wealthy man, Basheer (Hamid Wajeeh), whose scam was later exposed to Zaina's father. Hence, he favored Shifaz and Zaina's marriage despite her mother's disapproval. Meanwhile, Mohamed visits Male' hoping to reunite with his long-lost brother and stays with Ruqiyya (Haajara Abdul Kareem) a vile woman who mistreats her visitor.

Cast 
 Mohamed Rasheed as Ali Shifaz
 Mariyam Rasheedha as Zaina
 Ahmed Sharumeel as Mohamed
 Haajara Abdul Kareem as Ruqiyya
 Hamid Wajeeh as Basheer
 Fathimath Mohamed Didi as Dhon Didi
 Hassan Mufeed
 Mohamed Saleem
 Nasheedha
 Mohamed Afrah as Mujey
 Zuleykha
 Khadheeja Ahmed
 Shaheedha
 Nizam Abdulla
 Abdulla Rasheed
 Irushad
 Shuaib Ahmed
 Ilhana Rasheed
 Ahmed Shafeeq
 Saeed Ali
 Kamana
 Thoha Badheeu
 Mohamed Ashraf

Soundtrack

Reception
Upon release, the film received mainly positive reviews from critics where the performance of Mohamed Rasheed, Mariyam Rasheedha and Haajara Abdul Kareem were praised for playing the role with the required emotions.

References

Maldivian drama films
1988 films
1988 drama films
Dhivehi-language films